Orthoceras novae-zeelandiae, commonly known as the New Zealand horned orchid, is a species of orchid native to New Zealand. In Māori it is called hūperei or perei.

Description 
Orthoceras novae-zeelandiae is a terrestrial, perennial, tuberous, herb. 
Flowering occurs from December to March.

Taxonomy and naming 
It was first described in 1989 by Mark Alwin Clements, David L. Jones, and Brian Molloy.

Distribution and habitat 
Orthoceras novae-zeelandiae is found in the North and South Island of New Zealand. It ranges from Costal to Montane environments (up to 800 meters)

References 

Orchids of New Zealand
Plants described in 1989
Diuridinae